Bloody Friday may refer to:
Bloody Friday (1919), also known as the Battle of George Square, a riot in Glasgow in 1919
Bloody Friday (Minneapolis), a police shooting of pickets in Minneapolis in 1934
Bloody Friday (1968), demonstrations against the Brazilian military regime and civil responses to police repression
Bloody Friday (1970), an attack by construction workers on students protesting the Vietnam War
Bloody Friday (1972), a series of bombings by the Provisional Irish Republican Army
Bloody Friday (1993), an ethnic cleansing against the Kongo during the Angolan Civil War
Bloody Friday (1998), a confrontation between university students and police forces during the May 1998 riots in Indonesia
Bloody Friday (2008), the stock market crash on 24 October 2008, which saw many of the world's stock exchanges experience the worst declines in their history, with drops of around 10% in most indices
Bloody Friday (2015), a series of terrorist attacks, involving mainly the Islamic State of Iraq and the Levant, occurred on June 26
Bloody Friday (film), a 1972 German-Italian crime film
Bloody Friday (2022), a massacre of protesters by regime forces in Zahedan, Iran

See also
Black Friday (disambiguation)
Friday the 13th